Nyaradzo Secondary School is a school in Zhombe Empress Mine Ward 8 Kwekwe District in the Midlands Province of Zimbabwe.

Location
The school is 3 km south of Empress Mine and 90 km north-west of Kwekwe (by road_ shortest route)

History
It was established in 1981    as Mbuya Nehanda School but later changed to Nyaradzo High School because there were numerous schools named Mbuya Nehanda. The school was granted A-level status in 2013. It serves learners from as far as Sengezi, Chinyudze, Beemine and surrounding areas.

Alumni
Rodrick Mutuma Soccer Star. He completed Junior Certificate here after doing Grade 5 to 7 at Mopani Primary School.

References
 

Day schools in Zimbabwe
Education in Midlands Province
Educational institutions established in 1981
1981 establishments in Zimbabwe